Billy Bounce was a comic strip published erratically by noted illustrator W. W. Denslow (1901–1902) and later C. W. Kahles (1902–1905) between November 10, 1901, and December 3, 1905. The strip centers on the actions of the title character, a ball-shaped boy who is capable either of bouncing long distances or actual flight. It is noted as one of the earliest comic strips in which the protagonist has superpowers.

Like its contemporary, Little Nemo in Slumberland, which came shortly after Billy Bounce, the strip dealt with otherworldly situations and often had recurring characters, including the King of the Pollywogs, Fuzzy White and Prunes the Pieman. An alternate title for the series was Billy Bounce and the Pollywogs; the Pollywogs were introduced on October 9, 1904.

In September 1906, Denslow published a single novel based on Billy's adventures, titled simply Billy Bounce. Denslow provided illustrations and the text was written by Dudley A. Bragdon. It was published by G. W. Dillingham Company in New York.

References

Bounce, Billy
1901 comics debuts
1906 comics endings
American comic strips
Fantasy comics
Humor comics
Comics about dreams
Bounce, Billy